John Evans  (1871– 1939) was a Welsh international footballer. He was part of the Wales national football team between 1893 and 1894, playing 3 matches. He played his first match on 5 April 1893 against Ireland and his last match on 12 March 1894 against England. At club level, he played for Oswestry Town, Chirk and Oswestry United.

See also
 List of Wales international footballers (alphabetical)

References

External links
 
 

1859 births
Welsh footballers
Wales international footballers
Oswestry Town F.C. players
Place of birth missing
Date of death missing
1939 deaths
Association football forwards
Oswestry United F.C. players